Talayarde may refer to:

 Talayarde River,  a tributary of the Sainte-Anne river in Quebec, Canada
 Talayarde North-East River, a tributary of the Talayarde River in Quebec, Canada